Youssra Karim (born 26 March 1997) is a Moroccan para-athlete who specializes in throwing events. She represented Morocco at the Paralympic Games.

Career
Karim competed in the able-bodied weightlifting in the 58 kg category at the 2014 Summer Youth Olympics.

Karim represented Morocco in the women's shot put F41 event at the 2016 Summer Paralympics and finished in fourth place with a personal best of 8.16 metres. Karim represented Morocco in the women's discus throw F41 event at the 2020 Summer Paralympics and won a silver medal.

References

1997 births
Living people
People from El Jadida
Paralympic athletes of Morocco
Medalists at the World Para Athletics Championships
Weightlifters at the 2014 Summer Youth Olympics
Athletes (track and field) at the 2016 Summer Paralympics
Athletes (track and field) at the 2020 Summer Paralympics
Medalists at the 2020 Summer Paralympics
Paralympic silver medalists for Morocco
Paralympic medalists in athletics (track and field)
Moroccan female discus throwers
Moroccan female weightlifters
20th-century Moroccan women
21st-century Moroccan women